Ryan MacInnis (born February 14, 1996) is an American professional ice hockey forward. He is currently playing under contract with Adler Mannheim of the Deutsche Eishockey Liga (DEL). MacInnis was selected by the Arizona Coyotes in the second round (43rd overall) of the 2014 NHL Entry Draft. His father is the Hockey Hall of Fame defenseman Al MacInnis.

Playing career
MacInnis trained with the USA Hockey National Team Development Program team during the 2012–13 season. He played with Team USA at the 2012 Winter Youth Olympics, and he help the USA squad capture a bronze medal at the 2013 World U-17 Hockey Challenge 
MacInnis joined the Kitchener Rangers of the Ontario Hockey League for the 2013–14 season, and was invited to take part in both the 2013 CCM/NHL Top Prospects Game and the 2014 CHL/NHL Top Prospects Game.

On April 10, 2015, MacInnis was signed to a three-year entry level contract with the Arizona Coyotes.

At the completion of the 2017–18 season, and having been unable to make progression in two seasons with the Coyotes' affiliate, the Tucson Roadrunners, MacInnis was traded to the Columbus Blue Jackets in exchange for Jacob Graves on July 19, 2018.

MacInnis made his first appearance in an NHL game with the Blue Jackets on December 21, 2019 against the New Jersey Devils. On December 27, 2019, MacInnis picked up his first career NHL point with an assist against the Washington Capitals.

As a free agent from the Blue Jackets after three seasons within the organization, MacInnis signed a one-year, two-way contract to join the Buffalo Sabres on July 30, 2021. In the  season, MacInnis primarily featured with the Sabres AHL affiliate, the Rochester Americans. He was recalled and made a single appearance with the Sabres going scoreless. 

Leaving the Sabres organization as a free agent, MacInnis went un-signed over the summer leading into the 2022–23 season. On October 4, 2022, MacInnis agreed to his first contract abroad in signing a one-year deal with German club, Adler Mannheim of the DEL.

Career statistics

Regular season and playoffs

International

Awards and honors

References

External links

1996 births
Adler Mannheim players
American men's ice hockey centers
Arizona Coyotes draft picks
Buffalo Sabres players
Cleveland Monsters players
Columbus Blue Jackets players
Kitchener Rangers players
Living people
Rochester Americans players
Springfield Falcons players
Tucson Roadrunners players
USA Hockey National Team Development Program players
Ice hockey players at the 2012 Winter Youth Olympics